North al Gazera is a district of Al Jazirah state, Sudan.

References

Districts of Sudan